Paired mesoderm homeobox protein 2 is a protein that in humans is encoded by the PRRX2 gene.

Function 

The DNA-associated protein encoded by this gene is a member of the paired family of homeobox proteins. Expression is localized to proliferating fetal fibroblasts and the developing dermal layer, with downregulated expression in adult skin. Increases in expression of this gene during fetal but not adult wound healing suggest a possible role in mechanisms that control mammalian dermal regeneration and prevent formation of scar response to wounding. The expression patterns provide evidence consistent with a role in fetal skin development and a possible role in cellular proliferation.

References

Further reading

Transcription factors